The Brummer class consisted of two light mine-laying cruisers built for the Imperial German Navy in World War I:  and . When the war broke out, the Germans had only two older mine-laying cruisers. Although most German cruisers were fitted for mine-laying, a need for fast specialized ships existed. The Imperial Russian Navy had ordered sets of steam turbines for the first two ships of the s from the AG Vulcan shipyard in Stettin. This machinery was confiscated on the outbreak of war and used for these ships. Both vessels were built by AG Vulcan.

The two ships laid a series of minefields during their career, though their most significant success came in October 1917, when they attacked a British convoy to Norway. They sank two escorting destroyers and nine of the twelve merchant ships from the convoy. They escaped back to Germany without damage. The two ships were interned at Scapa Flow after the end of the war, and were subsequently scuttled by their crews on 21 June 1919. Brummer was sunk in deep water and was never raised, but the wreck of Bremse was sold to Cox & Danks on 28 October 1925, raised on 27 November 1929, and broken up at Lyness during 1929–1931.

Design and construction
In 1913, AG Vulcan in Stettin received a contract to build a set of four high-powered steam turbines for the Russian Navy for use in their new light cruiser , then under construction in Russia. After the outbreak of World War I in August 1914, which saw Germany and Russia on opposing sides, the German government prevented the delivery of the turbines. Existing light cruisers could not be used for the purpose as there were no such vessels not already assigned to other tasks.

The Construction Department prepared an initial proposal, which it submitted during a meeting of the RMA on 11 November. Admiral Alfred von Tirpitz initially disagreed with the idea, preferring minelaying submarines instead, but the department heads decided to proceed with the cruiser proposal over his objection. Tirpitz eventually agreed on 5 December, and six days later AG Vulcan received the initial outline of the proposal. On 23 December, the RMA placed the formal order with Vulcan, which specified the general parameters for the new ships but left design specifics to Vulcan's internal design staff.

The RMA concurred with the assessment on 19 January and informed Vulcan four days later that the design would have to be revised. Tirpitz and Kaiser Wilhelm II issued their approval to the revised specifications between 12 and 23 February, though authorization for Vulcan to begin construction was issued on the 15th.

Design work on the ships was completed in February 1915. The new ships would be capable of mining an area under cover of darkness and quickly returning to port before they could be intercepted. They were designed to resemble the British s to aid in their ability to operate off the British coast. During construction, the shape of their bow and its resemblance to British cruisers was covered by sheet metal to conceal their appearance.

General characteristics
Their hulls were built with longitudinal steel frames. The hulls were divided into twenty-one watertight compartments and incorporated a double bottom that extended for forty-four percent of the length of the keel. Brummer differed slightly, as she had a row of portholes amidships that her sister Bremse did not have.

Brummer and Bremse were fitted with masts similar to the British Arethusa-class cruisers, and similarly to the British ships, the masts could be lowered and stored on the superstructure deck. Their bow was also modeled on the Arethusa-class ships to further disguise the vessels. The ships had a complement of 16 officers and 293 enlisted men. They carried several smaller vessels, including one picket boat, one barge, and two dinghies. The German Navy regarded the ships as excellent sea boats, having gentle motion. The ships were highly maneuverable and had a tight turning radius, and only lost slight speed in a head sea. In hard turns, they lost up to sixty percent speed. They were very crank, however.

Machinery
The two ships' propulsion systems consisted of two AEG-Vulcan turbines powered by two coal-fired Marine Doppelkessel double-ended water-tube boilers and four oil-fired Öl-Marine double-ended boilers.

Electrical power was provided by two turbo generators and one diesel generator. Steering was controlled by a single, large rudder.

Armament and armor

The ships were armed with four  SK L/45 guns in single pedestal mounts; all four were placed on the centerline so all four guns could fire on the broadside. One was placed forward on the forecastle, a second was located between the first and second funnel and two were arranged in a superfiring pair aft. They were supplied with 600 rounds of ammunition, for 150 shells per gun. Brummer and Bremse also carried two  SK L/45 anti-aircraft guns mounted on the centerline astern of the funnels. The ships were also equipped with a pair of  torpedo tubes with four torpedoes in a swivel mount amidships. Designed as mine-layers, they carried up to 450 mines, depending on the type. Two rails ran down the main deck to the stern to allow the mines to be dropped behind the ship.

The Brummer-class cruisers' armor was fabricated from Krupp cemented steel. Atop the conning tower was the bridge, which included a splinter-proof chart house. All three funnels were equipped with a steel glacis for splinter protection.

Construction
Mine Steamer C (to be Brummer) was laid down at the AG Vulcan shipyard in Stettin on 24 April 1915. Work proceeded quickly, and the ship was launched on 11 December 1915. After the completion of fitting-out work, the ship was commissioned into the High Seas Fleet on 2 April 1916. Mine Steamer D (Bremse) followed her sister onto the ways at AG Vulcan three days later. She was launched on 11 March 1916 and completed in less than four months; the ship was commissioned into the fleet on 1 July 1916.

Service
After their commissioning, Brummer and Bremse served with the High Seas Fleet, including on a sortie into the North Sea in October 1916. The ships laid a minefield off Norderney in January 1917 and guarded minesweepers between March and May that year. In October 1917, Admiral Reinhard Scheer sent the two ships to attack a British convoy to Norway to divert forces protecting convoys in the Atlantic. Scheer chose Brummer and Bremse because of their high speed and large radius of action. Shortly after dawn on 17 October, the two cruisers attacked the convoy, which consisted of twelve merchant ships, two destroyers, and two armed trawlers. In the ensuing action off Lerwick, the German ships quickly sank the escorting destroyers and nine of the twelve cargo vessels. The British Admiralty was not informed of the attack until Brummer and Bremse were safely steaming back to Germany.

Along with the most modern units of the High Seas Fleet, Brummer and Bremse were included in the ships specified for internment at Scapa Flow by the victorious Allied powers. The ships steamed out of Germany on 21 November 1918 in single file, commanded by Rear Admiral Ludwig von Reuter. Reuter believed that the British intended to seize the German ships on 21 June 1919, and so he ordered the ships to be sunk at the next opportunity. On the morning of 21 June, the British fleet left Scapa Flow to conduct training maneuvers, and at 11:20 Reuter transmitted the order to scuttle his ships. Brummer sank at 13:05; she was never raised for scrapping and remains on the bottom of Scapa Flow. Bremse sank at 14:30 and was ultimately raised on 27 November 1929 and broken up for scrap from December 1929 to May 1931 at Lyness. The salvage rights to the wreck of Brummer passed through various hands between 1962 and 1981; ownership of the wreck was transferred from the Ministry of Defence (United Kingdom) to Orkney Islands Council in 1985; the wreck was declared a scheduled monument on 23 May 2001.

Footnotes

Notes

Citations

References

Further reading
 
 

Cruiser classes
Mine warfare vessel classes